Mohamed Hamouda was an Egyptian boxer. He competed in the men's featherweight event at the 1948 Summer Olympics.

References

External links
 

Year of birth missing
Possibly living people
Egyptian male boxers
Olympic boxers of Egypt
Boxers at the 1948 Summer Olympics
Featherweight boxers
People from Cairo